Gernot Schwab (born 10 January 1979) is an Austrian luger who has competed since 1999. A natural track luger, he won two gold medals at the 2007 FIL World Luge Natural Track Championships in the men's singles and mixed team events.

Schwab also won two medals at the FIL European Luge Natural Track Championships in the men's singles event with a gold in 2006 and a bronze in 2002.

References
FIL-Luge profile
Natural track European Championships results 1970-2006 (eiskanal.com)
Natural track World Championships results: 1979-2007 (eiskanal.com)

External links 
 

1979 births
Living people
Austrian male lugers